Tsatur Aghayan (– 3 December 1982) was a Soviet-Armenian historian, a professor at Yerevan State University, an academician of the Armenian Academy of Sciences, the editor of the journal Lraber Hasarakakan Gitutyunneri, and a renowned scientist of the Armenian SSR (1974). Aghayan was born in the village of Pip, Dashkesan.

He headed the branches of Soviet and modern history at the Institute of History (Armenian Sciences Academy), and from 1961 to 1968, he directed the Armenian branch of the Institute of Marxism-Leninism. His works are dedicated to the Armenian National Liberation Movement of the 19th and 20th centuries, Andranik Ozanian's activities, and the socioeconomic conditions of pre-Soviet Transcaucasia. He died in 1982 in Yerevan.

He is buried in the Tokhmakh cemetery with Siranush Aghayan Simoni.

Works
From the history of Armenian people's liberational movement, Yerevan, 1976,
Revolutionary movements in Armenia 1905-1907, Yerevan, 1955.

References

Concise Armenian Encyclopedia, Ed. by acad. K. Khudaverdyan, Yerevan, 1990, Vol. 1, p. 123.

External links
Biography

1912 births
1982 deaths
20th-century Armenian historians
Academic staff of Yerevan State University
Recipients of the Order of the Red Banner of Labour
Soviet Armenians
Soviet historians